Andrzej Pyrdoł (born 25 December 1945) is a Polish football manager.

References

1945 births
Living people
Polish football managers
ŁKS Łódź managers
Widzew Łódź managers
I liga managers